Concerto grosso in G minor, Op. 6, No. 8 by Arcangelo Corelli, known commonly as the Christmas Concerto, was commissioned by Cardinal Pietro Ottoboni and published posthumously in 1714 as part of Corelli's Twelve concerti grossi, Op. 6. The concerto bears the inscription  (made for the night of Christmas). Its composition date is uncertain, but there is a record of Corelli having performed a Christmas concerto in 1690 for the enjoyment of his new patron.

The concerto is scored for an ensemble consisting of two concertino violins and cello, ripieno strings and continuo. The work is structured as a concerto da chiesa, in this case expanded from a typical four movement structure to six:

Each relatively short movement provides multiple tempi and a range of major and minor suspensions. The concerto is generally no longer than fifteen minutes, ending with Corelli's famous Pastorale ad libitum, a peaceful  finale in the pastorale form.

References 
 The Oxford Dictionary of Music by Michael Kennedy, 1994, Oxford University Press.
 Outlines of Music History by Clarence Grant Hamilton, 1924, Oliver Ditson Company.

External links 

 Free typeset sheet music from Cantorion.org (this is an arrangement for string quartet, not the original)
, Liverpool String Quartet

Compositions by Arcangelo Corelli
Christmas music
1690 compositions
Compositions in G minor